
Nowa Sól County is a unit of territorial administration and local government (powiat) in Lubusz Voivodeship, western Poland. It came into being on January 1, 1999, as a result of the Polish local government reforms passed in 1998.

As of 2019 its total population is 86,384. The most populated towns are Nowa Sól with 38,763 inhabitants and Kożuchów with 9,432 inhabitants.

From 1999 until 2002, Nowa Sól County also included the areas which now comprise Wschowa County (the towns and gminas of Wschowa, Sława and Szlichtyngowa).

Neighbouring counties
Nowa Sól County is bordered by Wolsztyn County to the north-east, Wschowa County and Głogów County to the east, Żagań County to the south-west, and Zielona Góra County to the north-west.

Administrative division
The county is subdivided into eight gminas (one urban, three urban-rural and four rural). These are listed in the following table, in descending order of population.

References

 
Land counties of Lubusz Voivodeship